Xipholena is a genus of passerine birds in the family Cotingidae.

It contains three species:

References

 
Bird genera
Taxonomy articles created by Polbot